is a retired Japanese tennis player.

Tennis career
Kidowaki represented Japan at the 1992 Summer Olympics in doubles with Kimiko Date and they lost to Jana Novotná and Andrea Strnadová in the third round, in two sets. She also competed in the Australian Open main draw.

WTA career finals

Doubles: 2 (2 titles)

ITF Circuit finals

Singles: 11 (6–5)

Doubles: 12 (7–5)

References

External links
 
 
 
 
 

1969 births
Living people
People from Kyoto Prefecture
Sportspeople from Kyoto Prefecture
Japanese female tennis players
Olympic tennis players of Japan
Tennis players at the 1992 Summer Olympics
20th-century Japanese women